Radio Bileća or Радио Билећа is a Bosnian local public radio station, broadcasting from Bileća, Bosnia and Herzegovina. It was launched in 1992 by JU Centar za informisanje Bileća. This radio station broadcasts a variety of programs such as music, sport, local news and talk shows.

Program is mainly produced in Serbian from 7 am to 6 pm. The estimated number of potential listeners of Radio Bileća is around 10,361. Radiostation is also available in municipalities of East Herzegovina and in neighboring Montenegro.

Frequencies
 Bileća

See also 
List of radio stations in Bosnia and Herzegovina

References

External links 
 www.fmscan.org
 www.radio.bilecainfo.com
 Communications Regulatory Agency of Bosnia and Herzegovina

Bileća
Bileća
Radio stations established in 1992